The R310 is a Regional Route in South Africa that connects Muizenberg to the south-west with the R45 between Paarl and Franschhoek to the north-east, via Stellenbosch and Hellshoogte Pass. The section between Muizenberg and Stellenbosch is called Baden Powell Drive.

Route 
The R310 begins in Muizenberg at an intersection with the M4 (Main Road) . It runs east, hugging the coast (False Bay), bypassing Mitchell's Plain and Khayelitsha. It then veers inland, heading north-east and meets the N2 highway at an off-ramp skirting Eersterivier to the east to reach Stellenbosch. Here, it is cosigned with the R44 to the north, before again heading north-east, through the Hellshoogte Pass. On the other side, it passes through Pniel to end at an intersection with the R45.

References

Regional Routes in the Western Cape